Ann Jørgensen (born 1 October 1973 in Copenhagen) is a badminton player from Denmark.

Career
Jørgensen competed in badminton at the 1996 and 2000 Summer Olympics.

References

External links
 
 
 
 

1973 births
Living people
Danish female badminton players
Olympic badminton players of Denmark
Badminton players at the 1996 Summer Olympics
Badminton players at the 2000 Summer Olympics
Sportspeople from Copenhagen
20th-century Danish women